Jolene Rickard, born 1956, citizen of the Tuscarora nation, Turtle clan, is an artist, curator and visual historian at Cornell University, specializing in indigenous peoples issues. Rickard co-curated two of the four permanent exhibitions for the Smithsonian’s National Museum of the American Indian.

Biography
Rickard, granddaughter of Tuscarora chief Clinton Rickard, was born in 1956 at Niagara Falls, New York. In 1977 Jolene Rickard attended the London College of Printmaking. She received her BFA from the Rochester Institute of Technology and in 1991 she graduated with an MA from Buffalo State College. Rickard earned her Ph.D. in American Studies with a Native component from the University at Buffalo (SUNY) in 1996. After her education and having worked as a television art director and graphic designer, she moved back to Tuscarora Reservation in upstate New York.

Well known pieces by the artist include 3 Sisters, a 1989 black-and-white photograph and color xerox (the artist's sleeping face interposed with squash, beans and corn, the Three Sisters staple crops); and I See Red in the 90's, a 1992 six-panel photograph series in protest of the quincentenary of Columbus' landing in America, also including a self-portrait. Her ...the sky is darkening (2018), which incorporates beadwork by older traditional and contemporary artists, considers "deep reclamation of land by the Cayuga..." She sees her photography as ultimately linked to "the manipulations of light and texture and the representations of cosmological space and spirituality of earlier generations of Iroquois beadwork artists".

Academic career 
Rickard is currently an Associate Professor in the Department of Art History and American Indian and Indigenous Studies at Cornell University, and serves as the Director of the American Indian and Indigenous Studies Program. She also served as Interim Chair for the Art Department at Cornell between 2009 and 2010.

Curatorial projects
 Smithsonian National Museum of the American Indian, inaugural exhibitions: Our Peoples (2004-2014) and Our Lives (2004-2015), Washington, DC.
 Across Borders: Beadwork in Iroquois Life. Co-Curator. Collaboration with Dr. Ruth Phillips, Kanataka, Kanien'kehaka Raotitiohkwa Cultural Center and McCord Museum, Quebec, 1995-99.

Selected exhibitions
 Red River Crossing, visiting curator, Gary Sholette, The Swiss Institute, New York, NY, November 1996
 Reservation X, curated by Gerald McMaster, Curator of Contemporary Art, Canadian Museum of Civilization, QC, April 1998
 Native Nations, curated by Jane Allison, Barbican Art Center, London, UK, October 1998
 New Voices/New Visions, curated by Janeen Antone, Ansel Adams Center for Photography, San Francisco, CA, October 1998
 Lifeworlds – Artscapes: Contemporary Iroquois Art, curated by Sylvia S. Kasprycki and Doris I. Strambrau, Museum Der Weltkulturen, Germany, February 2004
 Western New York and Beyond Exhibition, Albright Knox, curated by Louis Grachos, Buffalo, NY, June 2005
 The American West, curated by Jimmie Durham and Richard W. Hill, Compton Verney Gallery, Warwickshire, GB, June through August, 2005
 Oh So Iroquois, curated by Ryan Rice, The Ottawa Art Gallery, ON, June 2007
Hearts of Our People, Minneapolis Institute of Art, Minnesota, June-Aug 2019; Frist Museum, Nashville, TN, Sept. 2019 – Jan. 2020; Renwick Gallery, Washington, D.C., Feb. – May 2020; and Philbrook Museum of Art, Tulsa, OK, June – Sept, 2020.

Awards
Ford Foundation Research Grant
Cornell University Society of the Humanities Fellowship on the thematic topic of "Global Aesthetics"; 2010-2011

Bibliography

   Proceedings of conference held in Venice, Italy, December 2005

See also 
 Native American women in the arts
 Visual arts by indigenous peoples of the Americas

References

External links
 

1956 births
Living people
20th-century American women artists
21st-century American women artists
Buffalo State College alumni
Cornell University people
Native American women artists
People from Niagara Falls, New York
Rochester Institute of Technology alumni
Tuscarora people
University at Buffalo alumni
American women curators
American curators